Blanket policy is a policy which behaves similarly to a variety of things. Based on Webster's Dictionary it "covers a group or class of things or properties instead of one or more things mentioned individually, as where a mortgage secures various debts as a group, or subjects a group or class of different pieces of property to one general lien."

References
Webster 1913 Suppl.

Policy